The Sky Is Red is a 1950 Italian drama film. It is the directorial debut of Claudio Gora and it is based on the novel with the same name by Giuseppe Berto, depicting the struggle for survival of a group of boys and girls in a bombed-out town in Italy during World War II.

It was shown as part of a retrospective "Questi fantasmi: Cinema italiano ritrovato" at the 65th Venice International Film Festival.

Cast 
Jacques Sernas: Tullio
Marina Berti: Carla
Mischa Auer: Daniele
Anna Maria Ferrero: Giulia
Lauro Gazzolo: calzolaio
Liliana Tellini: Nora
Amedeo Trilli

References

External links

1950 films
Italian drama films
Films directed by Claudio Gora
Films with screenplays by Cesare Zavattini
1950 drama films
1950 directorial debut films
Italian black-and-white films
1950s Italian films